The 91st Indianapolis 500 was held at the Indianapolis Motor Speedway in Speedway, Indiana on Sunday May 27, 2007. It was the twelfth Indy 500 sanctioned by the Indy Racing League, and marked the fifth race of the 2007 IndyCar Series season. Hélio Castroneves started the race on the pole position.

The race began at 1:11 p.m. EDT, and was televised in the United States on the ABC. The race was broadcast in high-definition for the first time. The race also was carried live on the IMS Radio Network and XM Satellite Radio.

On lap 113, the race underwent a lengthy rain delay, with Tony Kanaan tentatively sitting as the leader. After three hours, the rain ceased, the track was dried, and the race restarted shortly before 6:15 p.m. EDT. A crash on lap 162 between Dan Wheldon and Marco Andretti brought out the yellow flag with Dario Franchitti leading. Under the caution, rain began falling again and officials halted the race on lap 166. Dario Franchitti was declared the winner after leading 34 laps during the race.

All entries utilized ethanol, after 42 years of utilizing methanol. As part of a two-year roll-out, the cars used a 10% ethanol blend in 2006, and for 2007, the cars utilized a full ethanol mixture. Although branded as "100% percent fuel-grade", the fuel was actually a denatured 98% ethanol/2% gasoline blend (E98). The 2007 race was also the final 500 to see the Panoz chassis in competition.

Race schedule

News

The pace car for the 2007 Indy 500 was a Chevrolet Corvette. Patrick Dempsey was the driver.
Kid Rock headlined the Miller Lite Carb Day concert. Other performers during the month included Daughtry, Saliva, Augustana, and Bräck (a band headed by the former Indy 500 champion).
Indianapolis Colts quarterback and Super Bowl XLI MVP Peyton Manning served as the grand marshal of the IPL 500 Festival Parade on May 26, and waved the green flag to start the 2007 Indy 500.
No testing took place prior to the start of official May activities.
The initial official entry list was released on April 10, 2007, featuring 69 cars, four former winners, and one rookie.
Davey Hamilton's 02 car marks the first time in which a car number beginning with the digit "0" has been entered in the 500.
Dreyer & Reinbold Racing was fined $25,000 for the use of an illegal fuel mixture, containing 27% methanol (no methanol is allowed) in one of its cars during Pole day.  Team officials claimed this was due to an inexperienced crew member using an old container of fuel and was not intentional.  Indy Racing League chief administrator Brian Barnhart called this "at least plausible," noting that the presence of water in the fuel mixture supports the claim that the fuel was old.  The illegal mixture was used only during practice, not for a qualification attempt. From 1974 to 2005, only methanol fuel was used in the Indianapolis 500; and from 1965 to 1973, the rules were crafted in such a way to encourage the use of methanol in order to be competitive. In 2006, a 10% ethanol-90% methanol mixture had been used in the IRL in transition to the ethanol fuel used in the IRL for the 2007 season.
Jim Nabors, who sang "Back Home Again in Indiana" during the pre-race festivities twenty-nine times from 1972 to 2006, missed the 2007 race due to an illness. The fans were asked to sing the song in his place.

Practice (week 1)

Sunday May 6, 2007 - A. J. Foyt Opening Day & Rookie Orientation Program
Weather: Sunny, 73 °F
Practice summary: The first day of practice opened with a ceremonial lap celebrating A. J. Foyt's fiftieth year of participation at Indianapolis. Practice focused on the rookie tests of Milka Duno and Phil Giebler, as well as refresher tests by five veterans. Duno completed all four phases of her rookie test, and Giebler completed two. Michael Andretti posted the fastest speed of the day, while popular Davey Hamilton made his return to the cockpit, after a devastating 2001 crash at Texas. No incidents were reported.

Monday May 7, 2007 - Rookie Orientation Program
Weather: Sunny, 76 °F
Practice summary: The second day of Rookie Orientation saw the same seven drivers from the previous day's practice without incident. Rookie Phil Giebler finished the final two phases of his rookie test. Rookie Milka Duno completed the most practice laps of the day (74), while Michael Andretti posted the fastest speed for the second day in a row.

Tuesday May 8, 2007 - IndyCar Series practice
Weather: Sunny, 82 °F
Practice summary: The first full day of practice featured veterans on the track for the first time. Jon Herb was involved in the first crash of the month, doing a half-spin at the exit of turn two and crashing into the outside wall. Herb was not injured.

Wednesday May 9, 2007 - IndyCar Series practice
Weather: Morning rain, afternoon clouds, 78 °F
Practice summary: Rain in the morning and early afternoon delayed the start of practice until 4:00 p.m. The two-hours session saw heavy action, with Dan Wheldon leading the speed chart for the second day in a row. No incidents were reported.

Thursday May 10, 2007 - IndyCar Series practice
Weather: Partly cloudy, 86 °F
Practice summary: The warmest day of the week thus far saw some of the fastest laps turned so far for the month. Scott Dixon set fast lap with two minutes remaining in the session. Danica Patrick was second fastest for the day. No incidents were reported

Friday May 11, 2007 - "Fast" Friday IndyCar Series practice
Weather: Partly cloudy, 85 °F
Practice summary: The final day of practice before pole qualifying saw Scott Dixon turn the fastest lap of the month. Rookie Milka Duno crashed in the exit of turn 1. She spun and hit the SAFER barrier hard with the rear of the car, but she was not injured.

Qualifying (first weekend)

Saturday May 12, 2007 - AAMCO Pole Day
Weather: Sunny, high 82 °F
Qualifying summary: Pole day time trials were held under a new qualifying procedure, implemented in 2005, but not fully utilized in 2005 or 2006 due to rain delays. Only the top 11 cars would qualify on pole day, and the remaining would be "bumped" out. Each qualifying run consisted of four laps, and each car was allowed three attempts per day. Buddy Rice was the first out to qualify, but his speed ultimately did not make the top 11. During the first trip through the qualifying order, Team Penske pulled both Hélio Castroneves and Sam Hornish Jr. out of line, and decided to attempt to qualify later in the day, when the temperatures would be cooler. After the initial qualifying runs, Dario Franchitti qualified for the provisional pole position. Later in the afternoon, both Castroneves and Hornish completed qualifying runs, but neither were unable to knock Franchitti off the pole. Hornish's first attempt would have been fast enough to take the pole, but he nearly hit the outside wall in the southchute on his second lap. Even with this error, however, Hornish's run was only 0.0327 seconds slower than Franchitti's.  Almost immediately, Hornish withdrew and tried a second attempt, and again nearly took the pole, but on his final lap, his car bobbled in the north chute, and his second attempt was slower than his first. This would cost him a spot on the starting grid when Scott Dixon later withdrew his qualifying run and made another attempt, this one faster than Hornish's second attempt. With eight minutes left in qualifying, Castroneves' car was withdrawn, and he made a second attempt. After nearly four hours, Franchitti was finally knocked off the pole position. With only three minutes left, Tony Kanaan withdrew his first attempt, made the final qualifying run of the day. While his first three laps were fast enough to take the pole away from Castroneves, his last lap fell short and qualified second. This was Hélio Castroneves' second Indy 500 pole position. He also won the pole in 2003.

Sunday May 13, 2007 - Second Day Qualifying
Weather: Fair skies, high 74 °F
Qualifying summary: The second day of time trials filled positions 12–22 on the starting grid. The first hour saw heavy action, featuring strong runs from IndyCar Series regulars such as Scott Sharp (the first to qualify, and his 223.875 speed would hold up as the fastest of the day), Jeff Simmons and Darren Manning. Fan favorite Davey Hamilton also qualified with a solid speed. Later in the afternoon, Sarah Fisher became the second woman to qualify for the field. Bumping began with Marty Roth, Buddy Lazier and Jon Herb all being bumped. Herb went out later, and bumped himself back into the field, only to be bumped out a second time by Lazier. As time was running out, Jaques Lazier took to the track to try to bump himself into the top 22, and effectively bump his brother Buddy out. He was too slow and waved off the run. At the end of the day, two-time Indy 500 winner Al Unser Jr. was the most notable driver bumped for the day, and had to attempt to qualify on the second weekend.

Practice (week 2)

Wednesday May 16, 2007 - IndyCar Series practice
Weather: Mostly cloudy early, clearing late, high 62 °F,  WNW winds
Practice summary: The first day of practice for second-week deals. Only incident was a spin of Jimmy Kite's car when the gearbox casing of his PDM Racing Panoz cracked in turn 2, causing the left-rear suspension to fail. The car made moderate wall contact with the left-front corner and Kite was cleared to drive. Several teams that qualified during the first weekend tested race set ups and ran in packs, including Danica Patrick who set the fastest lap of the day. Jaques Lazier (217.159 mph) had the fastest lap among drivers who are not yet in the field.

Thursday May 17, 2007 - IndyCar Series practice
Weather: Mostly cloudy early, clearing late, high 65 °F,  North winds
Practice summary: The second straight day of cold and windy weather resulted in fewer than 800 total laps being turned among 23 drivers. The only incident of the day resulted when Stephan Gregoire lost control on the exit of turn 1 and backed the car into the wall in the south short chute. Only light damage was sustained to the car, but Gregoire complained of back pain and was transported to Methodist Hospital where he was diagnosed with a fracture of the third vertebra endplate and was ruled out for the rest of the month. John Andretti made his first appearance in an IndyCar since 1994 and completed his refresher test. Scott Dixon turned the fastest lap of the day while drafting with teammate Dan Wheldon. Gregoire (217.851 mph) turned the fastest lap among drivers yet to qualify before his encounter with the wall.

Friday May 18, 2007 - IndyCar Series practice
Weather: Sunny, high 65 °F
Practice summary: The final full day of practice went incident free as 31 cars took to the track. All the front runners were running in packs, learning how their cars performed in "dirty air." Sam Hornish Jr. turned the fastest lap of the day during such a session. The non-qualified cars of John Andretti and Roger Yasukawa both turned laps over  without drafting assistance as their teams trimmed their cars out to prepare for qualifying. Friday marked the last day of full practice; however, all cars will be permitted to practice on Saturday and Sunday during down periods when no cars are presenting to qualify.

Qualifying (second weekend)

Saturday May 19, 2007 - Third Day Qualifying
Weather: 72 degrees, sunny and fair skies
Qualifying summary: The third day of time trials focused on positions 23–33. Rookie Milka Duno was the first car to make an attempt, and she became the third female (along with Danica Patrick and Sarah Fisher) to qualify for the same race, an Indy 500 record, becoming the fifth female in Indy 500 history to start the race. Veterans Al Unser Jr. and John Andretti qualified solidly, while second-week drivers Roger Yasukawa and Alex Barron also completed runs. In the final hour, Jon Herb finally made the field, after being bumped the weekend before, but rookie Phil Giebler crashed on his fourth and final lap. Veteran Roberto Moreno, just named to replace Gregoire on Friday, along with Jimmy Kite, wrapped up the qualifying for the day. At the end of the day, the field stood with 32 qualified cars, one short of a full field. During the morning and afternoon, 32 cars made practice runs, most in preparations for race day. Since only 10 of the 11 allotted positions were filled, no bumping occurred Saturday.

†Qualification withdrawn on bump day.

††Bumped on bump day.

Sunday May 20, 2007 - Bump Day Qualifying
Weather: Sunny and warm
Qualifying summary: The field filled to 33 cars just before 3 p.m. as Richie Hearn completed a qualifying attempt. Phil Giebler recovered from his crash the previous day and was able to put his car solidly in the field, bumping Jimmy Kite. P. J. Jones and Jimmy Kite spent the afternoon trying to get their cars up to speed. In the final hour, both Jones and Kite were running out of miles on their Honda engines leases, and neither had made much progress. Ultimately, Jones gave up. Meanwhile, Kite decided to go out and make last ditch qualifying effort, but his speed was not nearly fast enough to bump Roth. The 6 p.m. gun sounded, and Roth held on to qualify for his third Indy 500.

Carb Day

Friday May 25, 2007 - IndyCar Series final practice
Weather: cloudy, humid, 82 °F
Practice summary: All 33 qualified cars took to the track and turned in a complete hour-long final practice without incident. Later that day at 3:30 the Miller Lite Concert started with headline act Kid Rock.

Friday May 25, 2007 - Checkers/Rally's Pit Stop Challenge
Team Penske won the 31st annual pit stop contest, their record tenth overall victory in the event. The teams of Hélio Castroneves and Sam Hornish Jr. (both Penske entries) met in the finals with Castroneves and his chief mechanic Rick Rinaman winning the $100,000 first prize after an 8.335-second pit stop.

Qualifying chronology

Starting grid

 = Former Indianapolis 500 winner;  = Indianapolis 500 rookie 

Failed to Qualify

Race summary

Pre-race
Weather: 76 degrees, cloudy and rain, some patches of sunshine in the afternoon

Rain fell overnight, but stopped before the gates opened in the morning. At 7:45 a.m., rain began to fall again, and threatened to delay or wash out the race. Around 10:00 a.m., the rain stopped and maintenance crews began to dry the track. Despite the morning showers, Speedway chairperson Mari Hulman George gave the command to start engines on time as scheduled at 1:05 p.m. EDT.

Start
During the pace lap, the race nearly took a dramatic turn as pole-sitter Hélio Castroneves failed to start. After several attempts, his car finally fired, and he joined the field in turn 4. A rather ragged start saw Castroneves take the lead into the first turn, but Tony Kanaan slipped by to lead lap one. Green-flag racing continued until lap 11, when John Andretti lost a rear-view mirror, bringing out a debris caution yellow flag.

When racing resumed, Castroneves, Tony Kanaan, Marco Andretti, and Scott Dixon all took their turn at the lead. Roberto Moreno caused the 2nd caution when he slid high in turn 1, slapped the wall, and hit the wall again in turn 2 before coming to rest. Jon Herb was the next car to be in an accident after he slid in turn 2 and hit the wall, ending his day. Milka Duno also spun in turn 1 and backed her car into the wall, damaging and ending her day as well.

On the 74th lap, Dario Franchitti took the lead for the first time, and led until he pit on the 89th lap. Around that time, officials were warning that rain was approaching the area. After several drivers sequenced through green-flag pit stops, Tony Kanaan led Marco Andretti. Suddenly, on the 99th lap, John Andretti got high in turn two, and crashed into the outside wall, bringing out the caution. Jeff Simmons found himself unexpectedly in the lead, but pitted a lap later, giving Marco Andretti the lead. With rain only a few miles away, the ensuing lap 107 restart could decide the winner. As the green came out, Tony Kanaan got the jump on Andretti, and took the lead in turn 1. Moments later, Phil Giebler spun and  crashed in turn 1, bringing the yellow out once again. Before safety crews could clear the track, heavy rain fell, and the race was red flagged.

Red flag
When the race was stopped, 113 laps were completed. A race is required to go a minimum of 101 laps before it can be official. If rain continued the rest of the afternoon, it could be declared official. Andretti Green Racing was scored 1st-2nd-3rd with Kanaan leading, Marco Andretti second, and Danica Patrick third. After nearly three hours, the rain stopped and the track was dry. Shortly after 6:00 p.m., the field lined up in the pits for a restart.

Restart
Tony Kanaan took over where he left off and pulled away from the field. Danica Patrick got by Marco Andretti and took over second place. Approximately 30 laps of uninterrupted intense green flag racing followed. Another sequence of green-flag pit stops saw all of the leaders head to the pits. Jaques Lazier stayed out a couple of extra laps, and led the race for the first time in his career. After the stops, Kanaan returned to the lead, followed by defending champion Sam Hornish Jr.

Finish
On the 151st lap, Marty Roth slid high in turn 1 and smacked the wall, and started an exciting sequence of events. The skies were darkening, and rain was fast approaching again, which would certainly end the race for good. Under the yellow, many leaders pit for tires and fuel, while some drivers, including Dario Franchitti and Scott Dixon, stayed out to gain track position. On the 156th lap, the field went back to green, however, in turn four, Tony Kanaan came up on the back of Jaques Lazier, sending Lazier into the wall, and sending Kanaan's car into a spin. He blew a tire and coasted into the pits. Moments later, the field assembled for what was expected to be the final restart before the rains came. Franchitti, working lap 163, held the lead into the backstretch. Behind him, Marco Andretti tangled with Dan Wheldon, and Andretti's car flipped down the backstretch. Buddy Rice was also involved. Before the track could be cleared, a heavy rainstorm fell on the track, and the race was called after 166 laps with Dario Franchitti declared the winner. A makeshift victory lane celebration was held indoors underneath the Pagoda, as had been done for Rice who also won in the rain in 2004.

As of the 2022 race, this was the most recent "500" to be shortened by rain.

Full race results

*C Chassis: D=Dallara; P=Panoz.  
All cars in the 2007 Indianapolis 500 used Honda engines and Firestone tires.

Race Leaders
Nine drivers led the race, with a total of twenty-three lead changes.

Caution Periods
There were eleven caution periods during the race, with a total of fifty-five laps run under yellow, including the race's final lap.

Awards
The Victory Celebration was held Monday May 28, 2007. Some of the many awards handed out during the evening included:
A record total purse of $10,668,815
Race winner Dario Franchitti won $1,645,233
Phil Giebler won the Rookie of the Year
Tony Kanaan won the Scott Brayton Driver's Trophy

Broadcasting

Television
The race was broadcast in the United States on ABC for the 43rd consecutive year. Time trials were shown live on ABC, ESPN, and ESPN2. For the first time, the race would be aired in high definition.

This was the final 500 broadcast for Rusty Wallace as he was involved with ESPN on ABC NASCAR broadcasts.

For the second year in a row, the telecast utilized the Side-by-Side format for commercial breaks.

Radio
The race was broadcast on radio by the IMS Radio Network for the 55th consecutive year. Mike King served as anchor. Davey Hamilton, who previously served as the "driver expert" on the network, returned to cockpit for the first time since 2001. After six years recovery from his serious crash, he offered live in-car reporting to the broadcast during caution periods.

Making a popular return to the IMS Radio Network was former "Voice of the 500" Bob Jenkins. In 2006, Jenkins had worked on the Speedway public address system, but for 2007, he took over the turn two reporting location. Jenkins filled the spot previously held by Adam Alexander, who departed the network.

For the third year in a row, Kevin Olson conducted his annual pre-race interview with David Letterman. Olson served as a pit reporter in the center pits during the early stages of the race, then later moved to cover the garages and track hospital.

See also
Indy Racing League
2007 IndyCar Series season

Gallery

Notes

References

Works cited
2007 Indianapolis 500 Daily Trackside Report for the Media
Indianapolis 500 History: Race & All-Time Stats - Official Site

Indianapolis 500 races
Indianapolis 500
Indianapolis 500
Indianapolis 500
Indianapolis 500
Indianapolis 500